Destructionism, as discussed by Austrian economist Ludwig Von Mises, refers to policies that consume capital but do not accumulate it. It is the title of Part V of his seminal work Socialism.  Since accumulation of capital is the basis for economic progress (as the capital stock of society increases, the productivity of labor rises, as well as wages and standards of living), Von Mises warned that pursuing socialist and etatist policies will eventually lead to the consumption and reliance on old capital, borrowed capital, or printed "capital" as these policies cannot create any new capital, instead only consuming the old.

See also
Creative destruction
Economic interventionism

Sources
Von Mises, Ludwig, Socialism.

Classical economics
Austrian School